North Dakota Highway 41 (ND 41) is a  north–south state highway in the U.S. state of North Dakota. ND 41's southern terminus is at U.S. Route 83 (US 83) north of Wilton, and the northern terminus is at US 2 east of Surrey.

Major intersections

References

041
Transportation in McLean County, North Dakota
Transportation in McHenry County, North Dakota